James Augustine Farrell Jr. (1901 - 1966) founded Farrell Lines with his brother.

Biography
He was born in 1901 to James Augustine Farrell. From his graduation from Yale University in 1924, he was a ship operator and owner. He and his brother and John J. Farrell (businessman) eventually became the founders of a shipping company named Farrell Lines. He died in 1966.

References

1901 births
1978 deaths
20th-century American businesspeople